Chen Zhengfeng (born 26 January 2001) is a Chinese footballer currently playing as a midfielder for Guangzhou.

Career statistics

Club
.

References

2001 births
Living people
Chinese footballers
Association football midfielders
China League Two players
Guangzhou F.C. players
21st-century Chinese people